Biendorf is a municipality  in the Rostock district, in Mecklenburg-Vorpommern, Germany.

People 
 Adolph Friedrich Johann Riedel (1809–1872), German archivar, industrialist, politician and historian
 Helmuth von Moltke the Younger (1848–1916), German field marshal

References